14 Lacertae is a binary star system in the northern constellation Lacerta, located around 1,600 light years away. It has the variable star designation V360 Lacertae; 14 Lacertae is the Flamsteed designation. The system is barely visible to the naked eye in good seeing conditions, having a peak apparent visual magnitude of 5.91. It is moving closer to the Earth with a heliocentric radial velocity of −16 km/s.

The primary component is a Be star that is spinning rapidly at its critical velocity. The lower mass secondary is synchronously rotating and is filling its Roche lobe. The rapid rotation of the primary may have been caused by mass transfer from the secondary.

Samus et al. (2017) classify this as a detached Beta Lyrae-type eclipsing binary, although they note there is some uncertainty in the classification. Bossi et al. (1998) argued that the system is neither an eclipsing binary nor an ellipsoidal variable. Instead they propose the variability is caused by distortion of a gaseous shell by the secondary component. Linnell et al. (2006) demonstrated that the light curve is mostly caused by tidal distortion in combination with illumination of the lower mass secondary by the primary.

References

B-type subgiants
F-type giants
Beta Lyrae variables
Lacerta (constellation)
Durchmusterung objects
Lacertae, 14
216200
112778
8690
Lacertae, V360